Nesopupa alloia is a species of very small air-breathing land snail, a terrestrial pulmonate gastropod mollusks in the family Vertiginidae the whorl snails.

This species is endemic to Hawaii in the United States.

References

Vertiginidae
Endemic fauna of Hawaii
Molluscs of Hawaii
Gastropods described in 1920
Taxonomy articles created by Polbot